Robinvale is a town on the south bank of the Murray River in north western Victoria, Australia. It is connected by a bridge to Euston on the other side of the river in New South Wales.

History
The Robinvale region is home to at least five indigenous groups with traditional ownership belonging to people from the Latji Latji and Dadi Dadi people. The region, particularly Bumbang Island houses a large number of culturally significant sites and heritage items. The town is named in memory of Lieutenant George Robin Cuttle, who was killed in action during air combat over France in 1918. The Post Office opened in 1924 as Bumbang, but was renamed Robinvale in August of that year.

Robinvale was connected to the rest of the Victorian railway network when the line from Manangatang was opened in 1924. Work began in the 1920s on a  extension of the line across the Murray River to Lette in New South Wales. It was never completed, and work was officially abandoned in 1943. The combined rail-road bridge across the river at Robinvale, which was constructed as part of the project, continued to be used until 2006, when a new road bridge was opened. The lifting span of the former rail-road bridge has been placed in a nearby park, as a permanent historical display.

Lock 15 on the Murray River is just downstream of the town providing a pool of irrigation water and ensuring that the river near Robinvale is permanently available for water activities such as water skiing. The weir and lock were completed in 1937, the last one built on the Murray (Locks 12–14 and 16–25 were never built).

The town, fictionalised as "Sunray", was the setting of the 1996 Australian feature film Love Serenade, directed by Shirley Barrett, which won the Caméra d'Or award at the 1996 Cannes Film Festival.

Today
Robinvale is known for production of grapes, olives, carrots and almonds.

There are many attractions in Robinvale, such as the original home of Robin Cuttle, an antique museum, park, and a caravan park overlooking the Murray River. The river is home to a great array of native birds and fish such as the pelican, swan, perch and the murray cod.

Robinvale is a popular camping area on the Murray.

Robinvale has a rail line that is used seasonally by Pacific National freight trains. V/Line runs coach services to Swan Hill and Mildura, Victoria, connecting with train services to Melbourne at Swan Hill railway station.  Robinvale Airport serves the town.

Robinvale and its twin town, Euston is home to an Italian population from the southern region of Calabria in Italy. It also has immigrant populations of Tongans and Vietnamese and a significant Aboriginal community, with Aboriginal people making up 8.1% of the population as of 2016 . Robinvale also had an irrigation project funded by Lower Murray Water, completed in late 2010.

Sister city
Robinvale is a sister city with the town of Villers-Bretonneux in the Somme department in Picardy in northern France.

Sport
Robinvale hosts numerous sporting events, a tennis Easter tournament, football, cricket and  the annual Robinvale Ski Race.
The town has an Australian Rules football team the Robinvale Eagles competing in the Sunraysia Football League. AFL players who've played for the club include Brownlow Medalist John James, Kevin Curran, Ivan Smith, Dick Vandenberg, Des McKenzie, Pat Curran and Phil Egan, along with cricketer Jamie Siddons.

Rugby League is also played with local club Robinvale Storm participating in the Sunraysia Rugby League competition.

Golfers play at the course of the Robinvale Golf Club on the Murray Valley Highway.

References

External links
Local information on Robinvale, Victoria can be found at: https://www.visitrobinvale.com.au/

Euston Weir (Lock 15)

Towns in Victoria (Australia)
Rural City of Swan Hill